Alana Castrique (born 8 May 1999) is a Belgian professional racing cyclist, who currently rides for UCI Women's Continental Team .

References

External links
 

1999 births
Living people
Belgian female cyclists
Place of birth missing (living people)
People from Roeselare
Cyclists from West Flanders
21st-century Belgian women